Bactrian may refer to:
Bactria
Bactria (satrapy), under the Achaemenid Empire
Bactrian language
Bactrian camel
Bactrian deer

Language and nationality disambiguation pages